Tametsi (Latin, "although") is the legislation of the Catholic Church which was in force from 1563 until Easter 1908 concerning clandestine marriage. It was named, as is customary in Latin Rite ecclesiastical documents, for the first word of the document that contained it, Chapter 1, Session 24 of the Council of Trent. It added the impediment of clandestinity and established the canonical form of marriage for validity in the regions in which it was promulgated.

Clandestinity
This was the document that added the impediment of clandestinity to the marriage law of the church. It was also the decree which ended a long debate about validity of marriage and produced sought after reform. Since the Sacrament of Marriage is administered by the parties to the marriage to each other, and not by clergy it is unique among the Sacraments. Fear of possible change in this doctrine prompted the debate, since prior to the Council of Trent (1545–1563), clandestine marriages had been considered valid. These marriages had resultant problems – questions over legitimacy of children; difficulties over inheritance, and the potential for conflict between those who considered they had a right to a voice in the matter.

It declared that while the Church has always disapproved of marriages contracted secretly, or without the consent of parents, "Tametsi" declared that clandestine contracts of marriage freely entered into are valid, unless rendered null by the non-observance of regulations made by the Church, and anathematizes those who hold the contrary as well as those who falsely assert the invalidity of a marriage contracted without parents' consent, or who affirm that parents by their approval or disapproval may affect the binding force of such contracts. 

Marriage contracted between baptized persons is a sacrament, even a mixed marriage between a Catholic and a non-Catholic, provided the non-Catholic has been validly baptized.

Canonical form of marriage
The outcome of Tametsi was to establish a juridical form of marriage. To be considered valid, the marriage required the presence of the parish priest or his deputy authorised by him or the ordinary. And the presence of two or three witnesses. Banns were to be read before the marriage was to take place. For the first time, a record of marriage was to be kept.

A liturgical form for marriage was established. Couples newly married were expected to receive the priestly blessing in the church, having prepared by Confession and Communion.

It was superseded in 1908 by Ne Temere, which stated that a marriage is invalid unless it is contracted before a parish priest in his own parish, or before a bishop in his own diocese, or by a delegate of either; and, as in Tametsi, in the presence of at least two witnesses. Also, the marriage must be registered in the place where the contracting parties were baptised.

See also
  Ne Temere

References

Catholic matrimonial canon law